Bebrene Parish is an administrative unit of Augšdaugava Municipality  in the Selonia region of Latvia (From 2009 until 2021, it was part of the former Ilūkste Municipality).

References 

 

Parishes of Latvia
Augšdaugava Municipality
Selonia